George Merrick may refer to:

 George E. Merrick (1886–1942), real estate developer in Coral Gables, Florida 
 George M. Merrick (1883–1964), writer of the Frank Buck serial Jungle Menace
 George Merrick (rugby union) (born 1992), English rugby union player